The Little Serenade, Op. 12, is a four-movement suite for string orchestra written in 1934 by Swedish composer Lars-Erik Larsson. The piece premiered in Gävle, Sweden, on 7 March 1934 with Larsson conducting the Gävleborg Orchestral Society.

On 5 April 1934 at the International Society for Contemporary Music (ISCM) World Music Days in Florence, Hermann Scherchen conducted Larsson's Sinfonietta to considerable acclaim, scoring for the composer the first international success of his career. In response, Universal Edition in Vienna signed a contract with the composer and published a number of his early works, among them the Sinfonietta, the Little Serenade, and the Concert Overture No. 2 (Op. 13, 1934).

Structure
The Little Serenade, which lasts about 11 minutes, is in four movements. They are as follows:

Instrumentation
The Sinfonietta is scored for the following instruments:
 Strings: violins, violas, cellos, and double basses

Universal Edition published the suite in 1936.

Recordings
The sortable table below lists commercially available recordings of the Little Serenade:

Notes, references, and sources

  

Compositions by Lars-Erik Larsson
20th-century classical music
Classical music in Sweden
1934 compositions
Orchestral suites